The 2017–18 FC Augsburg season was the 111th season in the football club's history and 7th consecutive and overall season in the top flight of German football, the Bundesliga, having been promoted from the 2. Bundesliga in 2011. In addition to the domestic league, FC Augsburg also participated in this season's edition of the domestic cup, the DFB-Pokal. This was the 9th season for Augsburg in the WWK Arena, located in Augsburg, Bavaria, Germany. The season covered a period from 1 July 2017 to 30 June 2018.

Players

Squad information

Competitions

Overview

Bundesliga

League table

Results summary

Results by round

Matches

DFB-Pokal

References

FC Augsburg seasons
Augsburg, FC